The Masham is a breed of domestic sheep which originated in northern England.  It is the progeny of a Teeswater ram and either a Dalesbred or a Swaledale ewe.  The ewes are hornless.

The breed takes its name from the town of Masham in lower Wensleydale, North Yorkshire.

References

External links 

Masham at Sheep 101

Sheep breeds originating in England
Masham